Empress Wang may refer to:

 Wang Zhi (empress) (王娡) (died 126 BC), empress of the Han Dynasty, married to Emperor Jing
 Empress Wang (Xuan) (王皇后, given name unknown) (died 16 BC), empress of the Han Dynasty, married to Emperor Xuan
 Wang Zhengjun (王政君) (71 BC–AD 13), empress of the Han Dynasty, married to Emperor Yuan
 Empress Wang (Ping) (王皇后, given name unknown) (8 BC–AD 23), empress of the Han Dynasty, married to Emperor Ping
 Empress Wang (Xin dynasty) (王皇后, given name unknown) (died 21), empress of the Xin Dynasty
 Empress Wang (Cao Fang) (王皇后, given name unknown) (fl. 254), empress of the Cao Wei state
 Wang Muzhi (王穆之) (died 365), empress of the Jin Dynasty, married to Emperor Ai
 Wang Fahui (王法慧) (360–380), empress of the Jin Dynasty, married to Emperor Xiaowu
 Wang Shen'ai (王神愛) (384–412), empress of the Jin Dynasty, married to Emperor An
 Wang Xianyuan (王憲嫄) (427–464), empress of the Liu Song Dynasty, married to Emperor Xiaowu
 Wang Zhenfeng (王貞風) (436–479), empress of the Liu Song Dynasty, married to Emperor Ming
 Wang Shaoming (王韶明) (fl. 490–494), empress of Southern Qi, married to Xiao Zhaowen
 Wang Shunhua (王蕣華) (fl. 499–502), empress of Southern Qi, married to Xiao Baorong
 Empress Wang (Jing) (王皇后, given name unknown) (fl. 552–557), empress of the Liang Dynasty, married to Xiao Fangzhi 
 Empress Wang (Xiao Cha) (王皇后, given name unknown) (died 563), empress of the Liang Dynasty, married to Xiao Cha
 Wang Shaoji (王少姬) (fl. 560–583), empress of the Chen Dynasty
 Empress Wang (Gaozong) (王皇后, given name unknown) (died 655), empress of the Tang Dynasty, married to Emperor Gaozong 
 Empress Wang (Xuanzong) (王皇后, given name unknown) (died 724), empress of the Tang Dynasty, married to Emperor Xuanzong
 Empress Wang (Dezong) (王皇后, given name unknown) (died 786), empress of the Tang Dynasty, married to Emperor Dezong
 Empress Wang (Yang Pu) (王皇后, given name unknown) (fl. 933–937), empress of the Wu state
 Empress Wang (Taizu) (王皇后, given name unknown) (942–963), empress of the Song Dynasty, married to Emperor Taizu
 Empress Wang (Huizong) (王皇后, given name unknown) (1084–1108), empress of the Song Dynasty, married to Emperor Huizong
 Empress Wang (Western Xia) (罔皇后, given name unknown) (died 1167/1168), empress of the Western Xia dynasty
 Empress Rensheng (仁聖皇后, given name unknown) (fl. 1213–1233), empress of the Jurchen Jin Dynasty
 Empress Wang (Jingtai) (汪皇后, given name unknown) (died 1505), empress of the Ming Dynasty, married to Jingtai Emperor
 Empress Wang (Chenghua) (王皇后, given name unknown) (died 1518), empress of the Ming Dynasty, married to Chenghua Emperor
 Empress Wang (Southern Ming) (王皇后, given name unknown) (died 1662), empress of Southern Ming

See also
 Empress Dowager Wang (disambiguation)

Wang